The Economy of Atlantic Canada relates to the economies of the Canadian provinces of New Brunswick, Newfoundland and Labrador, Nova Scotia and Prince Edward Island. The Canadian government Atlantic Canada Opportunities Agency is responsible for this sector.

Economy of New Brunswick
Economy of Newfoundland and Labrador
Economy of Nova Scotia
Economy of Prince Edward Island
Economy of Canada